Colin Healey Dickinson (14 October 1931 – 9 August 2006) was a New Zealand cyclist. He competed in the men's sprint and the tandem events at the 1952 Summer Olympics.

In 1990, Dickinson was awarded the New Zealand 1990 Commemoration Medal.

References

External links
 

1931 births
2006 deaths
New Zealand male cyclists
Olympic cyclists of New Zealand
Cyclists at the 1952 Summer Olympics
Sportspeople from Whanganui
Cyclists at the 1954 British Empire and Commonwealth Games
Commonwealth Games competitors for New Zealand